Umurage is a Spanish 2002 documentary film directed by Gorka Gamarra about the Rwandan genocide.

Synopsis 
In Rwanda, a hundred members of the Ukuri Kuganze Association, made up in its majority by survivors of the genocide, and a few of their executioners, freed after having confessed and asked for forgiveness in 2003, meet at a reinsertion center. These executioners are going home, in most cases to the same places where they carried out their crimes, and will have to "face" their victims and ask their forgiveness. In 1994, over a space of just one hundred days, almost a million people were murdered.

References 

2002 films
Spanish documentary films
2002 documentary films
Documentary films about the Rwandan genocide
Documentary films about reconciliation
2000s Spanish films